This is a list of football clubs in Turkmenistan.

 FC Ahal
 FC Altyn Asyr
 FC Aşgabat
 FC Balkan
 FC Daşoguz
 FC Gara Altyn
 FC Lebap
 HTTU Aşgabat
 Köpetdag Aşgabat
 Merw Mary
 Nisa Aşgabat
 Şagadam Türkmenbaşy
 Talyp Sporty Aşgabat

Turkmenistan
 

Football clubs
football clubs